The Syriac Catholic Patriarchal Exarchate of Basra, Iraq and the Gulf is an exarchate (Eastern Catholic missionary pre-diocesan jurisdiction) of the Syriac Catholic Church sui iuris (Antiochian Rite in Syriac language) for southern Iraq and the Gulf states, notably Kuwait.

It depends directly on the Syriac Catholic Patriarch of Antioch, without belonging to his or any other ecclesiastical province.

History 
It was established in 1991 on territory previously without proper Ordinary of the particular church sui iuris.

Ordinaries 
(all West Syriac Rite)

Patriarchal Exarchs of Basra and the Gulf 
 Athanase Matti Shaba Matoka (1997 – 2001), while Archeparch (Archbishop) of Baghdad of the Syriacs (Iraq) (1983.07.15 – retired 2011.03.01); previously Titular Bishop of Dara Syrorum of the Syriacs (1979.08.25 – 1983.07.15) & Auxiliary Eparch of Baghdad of the Syriacs (Iraq) (1979.08.25 – 1983.07.15)
 Father Charbel Issou (2001 – 2003)
 Father Eshak Marzena (2003 – 2014)
 Monsignor Emad Ekleemes (2014 – 2020)
 Firas Dardar (2020.09.10 – ...), while Titular Bishop of Tagritum of the Syriacs (2020.09.10 –  ...)

Source and External links 
 GCatholic, with incumbent bio links
 Catholic Hierarchy

Basra
Basra
Eastern Catholicism in Iraq
Catholic Church in Kuwait